In seven-dimensional geometry, a runcinated 7-cube is a convex uniform 7-polytope with 3rd order truncations (runcination) of the regular 7-cube.

There are 16 unique runcinations of the 7-cube with permutations of truncations, and cantellations. 8 are more simply constructed from the 7-orthoplex.

These polytopes are among 127 uniform 7-polytopes with B7 symmetry.

Runcinated 7-cube

Alternate names
 Small prismated hepteract (acronym: spesa) (Jonathan Bowers)

Images

Biruncinated 7-cube

Alternate names
 Small biprismated hepteract (Acronym sibposa) (Jonathan Bowers)

Images

Runcitruncated 7-cube

Alternate names
 Prismatotruncated hepteract (acronym: petsa) (Jonathan Bowers)

Images

Biruncitruncated 7-cube

Alternate names
 Biprismatotruncated hepteract (acronym: biptesa) (Jonathan Bowers)

Images

Runcicantellated 7-cube

Alternate names
 Prismatorhombated hepteract (acronym: parsa) (Jonathan Bowers)

Images

Biruncicantellated 7-cube

Alternate names
 Biprismatorhombated hepteract (acronym: bopresa) (Jonathan Bowers)

Images

Runcicantitruncated 7-cube

Alternate names
 Great prismated hepteract (acronym: gapsa) (Jonathan Bowers)

Images

Biruncicantitruncated 7-cube

Alternate names
 Great biprismated hepteract (acronym: gibposa) (Jonathan Bowers)

Images

Notes

References
 H.S.M. Coxeter: 
 H.S.M. Coxeter, Regular Polytopes, 3rd Edition, Dover New York, 1973 
 Kaleidoscopes: Selected Writings of H.S.M. Coxeter, edited by F. Arthur Sherk, Peter McMullen, Anthony C. Thompson, Asia Ivic Weiss, Wiley-Interscience Publication, 1995,  
 (Paper 22) H.S.M. Coxeter, Regular and Semi Regular Polytopes I, [Math. Zeit. 46 (1940) 380-407, MR 2,10]
 (Paper 23) H.S.M. Coxeter, Regular and Semi-Regular Polytopes II, [Math. Zeit. 188 (1985) 559-591]
 (Paper 24) H.S.M. Coxeter, Regular and Semi-Regular Polytopes III, [Math. Zeit. 200 (1988) 3-45]
 Norman Johnson Uniform Polytopes, Manuscript (1991)
 N.W. Johnson: The Theory of Uniform Polytopes and Honeycombs, Ph.D. (1966)
  x3o3o3x3o3o4o - spo, o3x3o3o3x3o4o - sibpo, x3x3o3x3o3o4o - patto, o3x3x3o3x3o4o - bipto, x3o3x3x3o3o4o - paro, x3x3x3x3o3o4o - gapo, o3x3x3x3x3o3o- gibpo

External links 
 Polytopes of Various Dimensions
 Multi-dimensional Glossary

7-polytopes